Whiteley Peak, elevation , is a mountain in Grand County, Colorado north of Kremmling and close to U.S. Highway 40. The mountain is in the Rabbit Ears Range, a range composed chiefly of volcanic rock, and Whiteley Peak has some columnar jointing near the top.

Whiteley Peak has been called "one of the most prominent landmarks in northwestern Middle Park."

Climbing
A narrow strip of privately-owned land encircles the peak, preventing public access for climbing.

References 

Mountains of Colorado
Mountains of Grand County, Colorado
North American 3000 m summits